Esmaeil Sharifat (born September 7, 1988) is an Iranian football player, who currently plays for Aluminium Arak of the Persian Gulf Pro League

Club career
Sharifat began his career with Foolad before joining Esteghlal Ahvaz. He then transferred to Esteghlal. In summer 2012, Sharifat returned to Foolad with signing a three-year contract. On 22 February 2014, he signed a new contract with Foolad until 2018.

Club career statistics
Last update 15 May 2015

 Assist goals

Honours

Club
Esteghlal
Iran Pro League Runner-up (1): 2010–11
Hazfi Cup (1): 2011–12

Foolad
Iran Pro League (1): 2013–14

References

External links
 Esmaeil Sharifat at Persian League

Iranian footballers
Persian Gulf Pro League players
Azadegan League players
Esteghlal F.C. players
Esteghlal Ahvaz players
Foolad FC players
1988 births
Living people
Association football forwards